Belews Creek is an populated place 705 feet above sea level in Jefferson County, in the U.S. state of Missouri.

History
A post office called Belews Creek was established in 1856, and remained in operation until 1905. The community was named after early settler  Silas Belews.

References

Unincorporated communities in Jefferson County, Missouri
Unincorporated communities in Missouri